Kothala Raayudu is a Telugu-language film starring Chiranjeevi.

Plot
Chiranjeevi plays a role with negative shades; the youngest son of a retired judge and youngest brother of a Police officer and a lawyer. His father believes that he's fit for nothing as he spends most of his time hanging out with his friends and chasing after girls. He sees Madhavi, who teaches his brother's kids and tries every trick to woo her. He manages to convince her that he's in love with her and promises to marry soon. Madhavi becomes pregnant and Chiru refuses to marry her. Meanwhile, he realizes that his father is being blackmailed by a bar manager (K. V. Chalam), as he has his father's photos with a dancer (Manju Bhargavi). To save his reputation, his father heeds the bar manager's demands. Chiranjeevi, with his friends, gets hold of the bar manager and in an attempt to teach him a lesson, the dancer dies. Chiru is accused of murder and he doesn't try to defend himself, as he feels that he needs to be punished for all his misdeeds. His father expires when Chiru is sentenced jail. When Chiru is released after his brothers prove him innocent, Madhavi, with a kid is accepted by his family.

Soundtrack
"Endaa Vaana Pellaade" -
"Go Go Go" -
"Oka Nelavanka" -
"Puvvuloy Puvvulu" -

References

External links

1979 films
Films scored by J. V. Raghavulu
1970s Telugu-language films